Khursheed Jah Devdi is a European styled architectural palace located in Hyderabad. It was built by the Ancestors of Paigah noble Amir-Paigah Khursheed Jah Bahadur Shams-ul-Umra IV, Its interiors were once adorned with expensive carpets and exclusive chandeliers. The gardens blossomed with flowers and fountains made the ambience livelier. It is located at Hussaini Alam, just a kilometer from the historic Charminar.

Despite numerous demands for restoration by heritage activists, the Khursheed Jah Devdi, once home to the Paigah nobles, now lies in ruins.

References

Heritage structures in Hyderabad, India
Hyderabad State
Palaces of Paigah of Hyderabad